Brilliant green (also known as  or ) is one of the triarylmethane dyes.  It is closely related to malachite green.

Uses

Brilliant green has been used to color silk and wool.

It is indicated for disinfection of fresh postoperative and post-traumatic scars, umbilical cord of newborns, abrasions, cuts, and other violations of the integrity of the skin, in the treatment of purulent-inflammatory processes of the skin - hordeolum ("barley"), meibomite, blepharitis, pyoderma, local furunculosis, carbunculosis, staphylococcal infection. It is applied externally, the drug is applied to the damaged surface, capturing the surrounding healthy tissue.

A 1% solution in 60% alcohol can be used for treatment of skin. 0.5% solution is used for mucous membranes or for infants.

Brilliant green is a visible light-activated photocatalyst in organic synthesis.

Safety and toxicity 

Brilliant green is effective against Gram-positive bacteria. The main advantage of brilliant green over the more common antiseptics such as iodine is that it does not irritate mucous membranes as harshly on accidental contact. Soviet medical doctrine deemed it "not for use on mucosa" and cautions that it can cause eye damage and ophthalmic chemical burns and burns to an eye, at least in the typical formulations produced for medical use.

Brilliant green induces vomiting when swallowed and is toxic when ingested. The compound may lead to serious injuries if it comes in contact with an eye, even resulting in bilateral blindness due to corneal opacification.

Politics 

In Russia and sometimes in Ukraine,  has been used to physically attack political opponents.

References

Triarylmethane dyes
Antiseptics
Staining dyes
Anilines
Diethylamino compounds

zh:煌綠